A number of units of measurement have been used in Cambodia to measure length, mass, volume, etc. The metric system has been compulsory there since 1914.

System before metric system

Length

Several units were used to measure length.  One muoi (or mot thuoc) was equal to 1 metre.  Some other units are given below:.

1 phyeam = 2 muoi = 2 m

1 sen = 20 phyeam = 40 muoi = 40 m

1 yoch = 400 sen = 16,000 muoi = 16 km

Cham am
The cham am is a unit of length, used during the 18th–20th century in Cambodia.

Thneap
The thneap is a unit of length, used during 18th – 20th century in Cambodia. It is equal to  cham am,  cm or about 20.8333 mm.

Weight

Several units were used to measure mass.  One muoi (mot dong can tay) was equal to 0.600 kg.  Some other units are given below:

1 lin =  muoi = 22.5 g

1 hun = 10 lin =  muoi = 225 g

1 chin = 10 hun =  muoi = 2.25 kg

1 tael = 10 chin =  muoi = 22.5 kg

1 neal = 16 tael = 600 muoi = 360 kg

1 pram roi (not can tay) = 1000 muoi = 600 kg

1 chong = 50 neal = 30,000 muoi = 18 t

1 hap (picul) = 20 chong = 600,000 muoi = 360 t

Capacity

Several units were used to measure capacity.  One sesep (vuong mot gia) was equal to 40 litres.  Some other units are given below:

1 muoi (vuong mot ba tay) =  sesep = 1 L

1 kantang =  sesep = 7.5 L

1 tao = 2 kantang =  sesep = 15 L

1 thang = 2 tao =  sesep = 30 L

Metric system

Length

Metric system has been compulsory with the name muoi mètre for meter.

Mass

Metric system has been compulsory with the following names:

1 muoi gramme = 1 g

1 hocsep = 60 kg.

Capacity

Metric system has been compulsory with the following names:

1 muoi litre = 1 L

1 sêsep litre = 40 L.

References

Cambodian culture
Cambodia